Franciszek is a masculine given name of Polish origin (female form Franciszka). It is a cognate of Francis, Francisco, François, and Franz. People with the name include:

Edward Pfeiffer (Franciszek Edward Pfeiffer) (1895–1964), Polish general officer; recipient of the Order of Virtuti Militari
Franciszek Alter (1889–1945), Polish general officer during WWII
Franciszek and Magdalena Banasiewicz (fl. mid-20th century), Polish couple who hid and rescued 15 Jews during the Holocaust
Franciszek Antoni Kwilecki (1725–1794), Polish nobleman, statesman, and ambassador
Franciszek Armiński (1789–1848), Polish astronomer
Franciszek Bieliński (1683–1766), Polish politician and statesman
Franciszek Blachnicki (1921–1987), Polish man who started The Light-Life Movement (Światło-Zycie) as a Catholic association
Franciszek Błażej (1907–1951), Polish military officer and anticommunist resistance fighter
Franciszek Bohomolec (1720–1784), Polish dramatist, linguist, and theatrical reformer
Franciszek Bronikowski (1906–1964), Polish Olympic rower
Franciszek Bukaty (1747–1797), Polish diplomat
Franciszek Cebulak (1906–1960), Polish Olympic football (soccer) player
Franciszek Chalupka (1856–1909), Polish theologian; founder of the first Polish-American parishes in New England
Franciszek Chudzik (2009-???) Co-Owner of Royal Studios
Franciszek Czapek (1811–unknown), Czech-Polish watchmaker
Franciszek Dionizy Kniaźnin (1750–1807), Polish poet of the Enlightenment period
Franciszek Dobrowolski (1830–1896), Polish theater director
Franciszek Ferdynant Lubomirski (1710–1774), Polish nobleman and Knight of the Order of the White Eagle
Franciszek Fiszer (1860–1937), Polish bon vivant, gourmand, erudite, and philosopher
Franciszek Gągor (1951–2010), Polish general officer, Chief of the General Staff of the Polish Army since 2006
Franciszek Gajowniczek (1901–1995), Polish army sergeant whose life was spared when Saint Maximilian Kolbe sacrificed his life for Gajowniczek at Auschwitz
Franciszek Gąsienica Groń (1931–2014), Polish Olympic skier
Franciszek Gąsior (1947–2021), Polish Olympic handball player
Franciszek Grocholski (1730–1792), Polish nobleman and politician
Franciszek Gruszka (1910–1940), Polish aviator who flew with the RAF during the Battle of Britain
Franciszek Hodur (1866–1953), Polish prelate of the Polish National Catholic Church
Franciszek Jamroż (contemporary), Polish politician, former Mayor of Gdańsk; imprisoned for corruption and bribery
Franciszek Jarecki (1931–2010), Polish Air Force aviator who defected to the West with a MIG-15 in 1953
Franciszek Jerzy Jaskulski (1913–1947), Polish soldier and commander in the anticommunist Freedom and Independence organization
Franciszek Kamieński (1851–1912), Polish botanist
Franciszek Kamiński (1902–2000), Polish general and activist of the peasant movement
Franciszek Kareu (1731–1802), Belarusian Jesuit priest; Superior General of the Society of Jesus 1801–02
Franciszek Karpiński (1741–1825), Polish poet of the Age of Enlightenment
Franciszek Kasparek (1844–1903), Polish jurist, professor of law, and rector of Kraków University
Franciszek Kleeberg (1888–1941), Polish general officer in the Austro-Hungarian army and subsequently in the Polish Legions
Franciszek Kniaźnin (1750–1807), Polish dramatist and writer
Franciszek Kokot (1929–2021), Polish nephrologist and endocrinologist
Franciszek Kostrzewski (1826–1911), Polish painter, illustrator, and caricaturist
Franciszek Krajowski (1861–1932), Czech-Polish military officer and general of the Polish Army
Franciszek Krupiński (1836–1898), Polish philosopher
Franciszek Ksawery Branicki (1730–1819), Polish nobleman, magnate, and a leader of the Targowica Confederation
Franciszek Ksawery Chomiński (died 1809), Polish politician, writer, and translator
Franciszek Ksawery Dmochowski (1762–1818), Polish Romantic novelist, poet, translator, and satirist
Franciszek Ksawery Drucki-Lubecki (1778–1846), Polish politician and government minister in partitioned Poland
Franciszek Ksawery Godebski (1801–1869), Polish writer and publicist
Franciszek Ksawery Lampi (1782–1852), Polish painter of the Romantic era
Franciszek Ksawery Zachariasiewicz (1770–1845), Polish Roman Catholic prelate, professor, and historian
Franciszek Latinik (1864–1949), Polish general officer
Franciszek Leja (1885–1979), Polish mathematician
Franciszek Lessel (1780–1838), Polish composer
Franciszek Lilius (1600–1657), Polish composer
Franciszek Lubomirski (died 1721), Polish nobleman
Franciszek Macharski (1927–2016), Polish Roman Catholic cardinal; Archbishop of Kraków 1978–2005
Franciszek Maksymilian Ossoliński (1676–1756), Polish nobleman, politician, collector, and patron of arts
Franciszek Malewski (1800–1870), Polish lawyer, archivist, and journalist
Franciszek Misztal (1901–1981), Polish aircraft designer
Franciszek Niepokólczycki (1900–1974), Polish military officer and anticommunist resistance fighter; imprisoned under Stalin
Franciszek Nowicki (1864–1935), Polish poet, mountaineer, and socialist activist
Franciszek Pieczka (1928–2022), Polish film and stage actor
Franciszek Piper (born 1941), Polish scholar, historian and author; specializing in the Holocaust
Franciszek Pius Radziwiłł (1878–1944), Polish nobleman and political activist
Franciszek Pokorny (fl. mid-20th century), Polish military officer and cryptographer
Franciszek Przysiężniak (1909–1975), Polish military officer and anticommunist resistance fighter; recipient of the Virtuti Militari
Franciszek Rychnowski (1850–1929), Polish engineer and an inventor
Franciszek Salezy Dmochowski (1801–1871), Polish writer, poet, translator, critic, and journalist
Franciszek Salezy Jezierski (1740–1791), Polish priest, writer, and activist of the Enlightenment period
Franciszek Salezy Potocki (1700–1772), Polish-Lithuanian nobleman; Knight of the Order of the White Eagle
Franciszek Sebastian Lubomirski (diet 1699), Polish nobleman
Franciszek Siarczyński (1758–1829), Polish Roman Catholic Piarist priest, historian, geographer, teacher, and writer
Franciszek Smuda (born 1948), Polish professional football player, coach, and manager
Franciszek Smuglewicz (1745–1807), Polish-Lithuanian draftsman and painter
Franciszek Starowieyski (1930–2009), Polish artist
Franciszek Stefaniuk (born 1944), Polish politician from Chełm
Franciszek Sulik (1908–2000), Polish-Australian chess master
Franciszek Szymczyk (1892–1976), Polish Olympic track cyclist
Franciszek Trąbalski (1870–1964), Polish socialist politician
Franciszek Trześniewski (died 1939), Polish gourmand and chef; eponym of the Trześniewski restaurant in Vienna
Franciszek Walicki (1920–2015), Polish jazz and rock musician
Franciszek Wielopolski (died 1732), Polish nobleman
Franciszek Wład (1888–1939), Polish general officer killed during the German invasion of Poland
Franciszek Wójcicki (1900–1983), Polish politician
Franciszek Zabłocki (1754–1821), Polish comic dramatist and satirist of the Enlightenment period
Franciszek Zachara (1898–1966), Polish-American pianist and composer
Franciszek Ziejka (1940–2020), Polish scholar
Franciszek Żmurko (1859–1910), Polish painter
Franciszek Żwirko (1895–1932), Polish sport and military aviator
Ksawery Lubomirski (Franciszek Ksawery Lubomirski) (1747–1829), Polish nobleman and Russian general officer

Polish masculine given names